Methyl pyruvate is the organic compound with the formula CH3C(O)CO2CH3.  This colorless liquid is the methyl ester of pyruvic acid.  It has attracted interest as a prochiral precursor to alanine and lactic acid.  It is prepared by esterification of pyruvic acid.

References

Methyl esters
Ketoesters